Mollalar, Barda may refer to:
Mollalar (40° 15' N 47° 29' E), Barda
Mollalar (40° 27' N 47° 11' E), Barda